The Apocalypse Code is a 2007 Russian action film. Apart from Russia, the filming took place in France, Italy, Norway, Malaysia and Ukraine. The crew spent 10 days shooting scenes in the Alvøen Island and Aurland fjords.

Plot
Terrorist Jaffad Ben Zayidi steals four nuclear bombs from a sunken American submarine and hides them in four major cities throughout the world. The charges can be activated by an 11-digit code. Zayidi dies and his accomplice, nicknamed "The Executioner," is about to blow up the bombs. The Executioner is chased by FSB, whose agent Marie has previously infiltrated Zayidi's team.

References

External links
 Info at VincentPerez.com
 

2007 films
2007 action films
Films about terrorism in Europe
Films shot in Norway
Films shot in Ukraine
Films shot in Paris
Films shot in Rome
2000s Russian-language films
Films about the Federal Security Service
Films shot in Kuala Lumpur
Russian action films